The Oder Dam is a dam in the Harz mountains of Germany. It lies above Bad Lauterberg in the district of Göttingen in Lower Saxony and impounds the river Oder. The dam went into service in 1934 after taking 3 years to build. The owner and operator of the Oder Dam is the Harzwasserwerke.

Purposes 
The reservoir serves the following purposes:
 Flood protection
 Low water regulation
 Power generation

These functions sometimes create conflicting demands. For flood protection, the reservoir should be as empty as possible; for low water regulation, it is desirable that the reservoir is as full as possible. Accordingly, there are for the water economy an operating plan that is dependent on the time of year and the expected water quantities. e.g. snow meltwaters at the end of winter, droughts in summer.

Dam 
The actual barrage is an embankment dam made of rubble (crushed stone) with a central concrete core and a grout curtain of clay. The concrete wall has joints that follow the shape of the whole dam, without leaking. The design is very similar in many respects to the Söse Dam built shortly beforehand.

Pumped storage hydro-electric power station 
The reservoir of the dam originally acted as the upper reservoir of the pumped-storage power station. Immediately below the dam is the lower reservoir with a 7.5 m high earth dam that acted as a stilling basin. The power station is also located at the foot of the dam. It has 2 turbines with a combined output of 5.04 MW (possibly as much as 6.2 MW).
The pumped-storage facility has not been used since the 1990s as it was no longer economical. The power station now operates simply as a storage power station with a Francis turbine.

Tourism 
The lake is open to watersports such as angling, sailing and surfing. There is also a local restaurant and a campsite.

See also 
 List of dams in the Harz
 List of reservoirs and dams in Germany
 Pumped-storage hydroelectricity
 Oderteich

Notes 
 Peter Franke, Wolfgang Frey: Talsperren in der Bundesrepublik Deutschland. Systemdruck, Berlin 1987,

External links 
 Oder Dam at en.structurae.de 
 Harzwasserwerke.de with link to the current dam data. 
 Sights in the Harz: The Oder Dam 
 The Oder Dam in the Harz 

Dams in Lower Saxony
Dams in the Harz
Dams completed in 1933